The "", also known by its incipit "Orientales, la Patria o la Tumba", is the longest national anthem in terms of duration with 105 bars of music. When performed in its entirety, the anthem lasts about four-and-a-half to six minutes, although nowadays only the first verse and chorus are sung on most occasions, such as before sporting events.

Its martial lyrics are by the Uruguayan poet Francisco Acuña de Figueroa, who also wrote the lyrics for Paraguay's national anthem, "Paraguayos, República o Muerte". The lyrics were officially declared the national anthem in July 1833. Several proposed musical settings failed to gain public support. The Rossini-inspired music that eventually became universally associated with the anthem was composed by the Hungarian-born composer Francisco José Debali, with the assistance of Fernando Quijano, a Uruguayan actor and musician. A few days after the first performance in July 1845, Debali's score was officially recognized as the music for the anthem. As with other South American national anthems, the music was inspired by the local popularity of Italian opera. It includes several references to La Cenerentola and other operas by Rossini, as well as a direct musical quotation from Lucrezia Borgia by Gaetano Donizetti.

The French composer Camille Saint-Saëns is sometimes erroneously credited with having composed the music: although he was requested to write a hymn to celebrate the national independence day, his composition never became the national anthem.

History
The Uruguayan poet Francisco Acuña de Figueroa, who also wrote the lyrics for Paraguay's national anthem "Paraguayos, República o Muerte", was responsible for the martial lyrics. On 8 July 1833, Orientales, la Patria o la Tumba was officially recognized as Uruguay's national anthem.

Several proposed musical settings of Figueroa's lyrics failed to gain public support. One of the discarded settings was by the Spanish-born composer Antonio Sáenz. A proposed melody by the Italian composer Francesco Casale became the basis for the music of the Paraguay national anthem.

The Rossini-inspired music that eventually became universally associated with the anthem was composed by the Hungarian-born composer Francisco José Debali, with the assistance of Fernando Quijano, a Uruguayan actor and musician. The  score was first performed on 19 July 1845, and it was officially recognized as the music for the anthem on 25 July 1848.

Music

As with every other South American national anthem, the music was inspired by the local popularity of Italian opera.
The full 105-bar version of the anthem evokes an operatic scena e aria for soloist and chorus (almost in solita forma manner, with a cabaletta-like conclusion). Debali had conducted in many productions of operas by Gioachino Rossini and Gaetano Donizetti in Montevideo, and during the course of the anthem he makes several musical references to Rossini's La Cenerentola, as well as to Largo al factotum from  The Barber of Seville, and to a chorus from Semiramide. A further passage is clearly borrowed from the ending of the Prologue of Donizetti's Lucrezia Borgia.

Of note, the music for the Uruguayan national anthem is sometimes erroneously attributed to Camille Saint-Saëns. It is true that during a visit to Uruguay in April 1916 Saint-Saëns was commissioned to write a hymn to celebrate the national independence day. However, circumstances prevented the work, Partido colorado, from becoming the national anthem.

Lyrics

Notes

References

External links
 
 Uruguay anthem streaming audio, lyrics and info (archive link)

Uruguay
Spanish-language songs
Uruguayan music
National symbols of Uruguay
National anthems
National anthem compositions in C major
1845 songs